Ram Kripal Sinha was a politician from the Indian state of Bihar. He was a former minister of state in the Government of India and a cabinet minister in the Government of Bihar. He is the office secretary of Bharatiya Janata Party Parliamentary Party Executive Committee.

Early life and education
Sinha was born in April 1934 in the family of Suryadeo Sinha in the Matihani village of Bihar. He obtained two Master of Arts degree in English and a Doctorate in Prakrit.

Career
Sinha started his career as a college lecturer based in Muzaffarpur town, Bihar. Shortly afterwards, he received his doctorate, he settled in Muzaffarpur of Bihar. In 1968, he was elected as a member to the Bihar Legislative Council which he served until 1974. In 1971, he was appointed as cabinet minister in the Socialist Party (India) government of Chief Minister Karpoori Thakur. On 3 April 1974, he was elected as a member of the Rajya Sabha, the upper house of Parliament of India and served as a parliamentarian until 1980. During this term, he was appointed as the Union Minister of State for Labour and Parliamentary Affairs in the Janata Party government of Prime Minister Morarji Desai and served in this post until the dissolution of Government in 1979.

Personal life
Sinha was married to Mridula Sinha who was the Governor of Indian state Goa and a writer in Hindi Literature and politician.

Death 
Shri Ram Kripal Sinha died on 15 January 2023 from congestive heart failure.

References

People from Bihar
Living people
Bharatiya Janata Party politicians from Bihar
Janata Party politicians
1934 births
Rajya Sabha members from Bihar
Union ministers of state of India
Members of the Bihar Legislative Council
State cabinet ministers of Bihar
People from Motihari
Bharatiya Jana Sangh politicians